The Mbari River is a river of the Central African Republic. It is a right tributary of the Mbomou River not far to the north of where the Mbomou joins the Uele River to form the Ubangi River.

Environment

The Mbari River is the main drainage axis of the Mbomou plateau.
A study published in 2002 found signs that forest plants were replacing savanna vegetation in the Mbari valley, in part due to sufficient annual rainfall, reduced frequency of bush fires and migration of rural people away from the region due to the economic crisis in Central Africa.

African wild dogs have been documented in the south of the CAR in the Chinko/Mbari drainage basin in 2013.

History

The Bandia clan separated from the Abaza clan in the early 17th century.
They controlled a large area between the Uele River and the Mbomou River.
In the last quarter of the 18th century one of their leaders, Ndounga, founded what became the Bangassou kingdom over the Nzakara people on the Mbari river.
His brother Kassanga founded what became the Rafai kingdom on the Chinko River.
These kingdoms prospered during the 19th century by participating in the growing slave trade, and thus avoiding raids by slave traders.

In the 1880s the chief Bangassou, whom the Belgians called Sultan Bangassou, began to obtain rifles from agents of the Congo Free State, and used these to expand his power.
In January he moved his headquarters to where the Mbari enters the Bangassou.
The Belgian Alphonse van Gèle founded the Yakoma post on the Ubangi River on 31 May 1890.
Bangassou visited him there on 14 June 1890 and signed a treaty placing his Nzakara kingdom under the protection of the Congo Free State in order to obtain trade goods, weapons and military support from the Europeans.
He sold huge quantities of ivory to agents of the Congo Free State.
In 1894 the Belgian Léon Hanolet ascended the Bari River while Théodore Nilis and Charles de la Kethulle ascended the Chinko River, another tributary of the Bomu.

Notes

Citations

Sources

 

Rivers of the Central African Republic